Tignall is a town in Wilkes County, Georgia, United States. The population was 546 at the 2010 census.

History
The Georgia General Assembly incorporated Tignall as a town in 1907. It was named for Tignall Livingston Moss, a lieutenant in the Confederate army who was killed in battle in 1862.

Geography
Tignall is located at  (33.866861, -82.741195). The town lies along Georgia State Route 17 south of Elberton and north of Washington, and a few miles west of the Georgia-South Carolina state line.

Demographics

As of the census of 2010, there were 615 people, 279 households, and 179 families residing in the town. The racial makeup of the town was 52.53% White, 45.48% African American, 0.15% Native American, 0.61% from other races, and 1.23% from two or more races. Hispanic or Latino of any race were 3.37% of the population.

There were 279 households, out of which 28.3% had children under the age of 18 living with them, 40.1% were married couples living together, 19.0% had a female householder with no husband present, and 35.8% were non-families. 33.3% of all households were made up of individuals, and 16.1% had someone living alone who was 65 years of age or older.  The average household size was 2.30 and the average family size was 2.87.

In the town, the population was spread out, with 24.7% under the age of 18, 5.7% from 18 to 24, 26.5% from 25 to 44, 24.5% from 45 to 64, and 18.7% who were 65 years of age or older.  The median age was 40 years. For every 100 females, there were 94.9 males.  For every 100 females age 18 and over, there were 85.0 males.

The median income for a household in the town was $18,077, and the median income for a family was $26,250. Males had a median income of $23,000 versus $14,740 for females. The per capita income for the town was $11,765.  About 16.6% of families and 20.0% of the population were below the poverty line, including 26.4% of those under age 18 and 21.1% of those age 65 or over.

Notable person
James E. Boyd, scientist and educator

Region

Central Savannah River Area

References

Towns in Wilkes County, Georgia
Towns in Georgia (U.S. state)